is a mountain located in the Akaishi Mountains in both Aoi-ku, Shizuoka, Shizuoka Prefecture and Iida, Nagano Prefecture, in the Chūbu region of Japan. It is the mountain in Minami Alps National Park located in the south most. It is also included on the list of "100 Famous Japanese Mountains." There are several mountain climbing trails and Mountain huts around the mountain. There is the Hijiri-Daira hut in the Mountain pass in the south.

Animal and Alpine plant 
A lot of alpine plants and Rock Ptarmigan are seen in the upper alpine region. Sika Deer is seen in the hillside.

See also
 Akaishi Mountains
 Minami Alps National Park
 List of mountains in Japan
 100 Famous Japanese Mountains
 Three-thousanders (in Japan)

Gallery

References

 

Akaishi Mountains
Mount Hijiri
Mountains of Nagano Prefecture
Mountains of Shizuoka Prefecture
Mount Hijiri